Sara al-Jarwan (born 1969) is an Emirati novelist, short story writer and playwright. Born in Ajman, she joined the UAE armed forces as a soldier just before the 1991 Gulf War. This experience was the basis of a book (Yawmiyaat Mujannada or Diary of a Recruit) as well as a play. She also served as an editor of Dara al-Watan, the magazine of the armed forces.

She is regarded as the first Emirati woman to have published a novel (Shajan Bint Al-Qadar Al-Hazeen, published in 1992). Since then, she has written three more novels, a short story collection, and a book of Emirati folk tales. She has won several awards including the Best Emirati Book prize in 2003 and the Al Owais Prize for best novel in 2012.

She was  a participant in the 2012 IPAF Nadwa. Her work has appeared in translation in Banipal magazine.

Novels
 n Bint Al Qadar Al Hazin, Sharjah, 1992 (novel)
 Ayqounat Al Hilm (The Dream’s Icon), Dar Al-Shurooq, Amman, 2003 (short stories, winner of Best Emirati Book award)
 Risa’il ’Ila Al Sultan (Letters to the Sultan), Dar Al-Shurooq, Amman, 2003 (novel)
 Turous ’Ila Moulay Al-Sultan, Al-Kitab Al-Awwal (Letters to My Lord The Sultan, Part One), Dar Al-Adab, Beirut, 2009 (novel)
 ‘Udhraa’ wa Wali wa Saahir (A Virgin, a Saint and a Magician), Arab Scientific Publishers Inc, Beirut, 2011 (novel, winner of Al-Owais Prize)

References

External links
 Biography of Sara al-Jarwan at the international literature festival berlin

1969 births
Living people
Emirati novelists
People from the Emirate of Ajman
20th-century Emirati women writers
20th-century Emirati writers
Emirati short story writers
Emirati military personnel
Emirati dramatists and playwrights
21st-century Emirati women writers
21st-century Emirati writers
20th-century novelists
21st-century novelists
21st-century short story writers